Alyaksandr Bychanok (born 30 May 1985) is a Belarusian former footballer. He has been capped for the Belarus national football team in 2011.

References

External links
 
 

1985 births
Living people
Belarusian footballers
Association football midfielders
Belarus international footballers
Belarus under-21 international footballers
Belarusian expatriate footballers
Belarusian expatriate sportspeople in Lithuania
Expatriate footballers in Kazakhstan
Expatriate footballers in Lithuania
Belarusian Premier League players
A Lyga players
Kazakhstan Premier League players
FC Dnepr Mogilev players
FC Shakhtyor Soligorsk players
FC Dinamo Minsk players
FC Kairat players
FC Gomel players
FK Riteriai players
FC Isloch Minsk Raion players
People from Mogilev
Sportspeople from Mogilev Region